William (Bill) Compston FAA, FRS (born 19 February 1931) is an Australian geophysicist.
He is a visiting fellow at the Australian National University.

Compston developed the sensitive high-resolution ion microprobe (SHRIMP), for isotopic analyses of geological samples. SHRIMP enabled the world's oldest rock to be identified in Western Australia.

Honours and awards
2001 Centenary Medal from the Government of Australia 
1998 Matthew Flinders Medal and Lecture of the Australian Academy of Science
1988 Mawson Medal and Lecture of the Australian Academy of Science

References

External links

http://www.cumpston.org.uk/#/william-compston-australia/4535032243

1931 births
Australian physicists
Australian geophysicists
Fellows of the Royal Society
Living people
Fellows of the Australian Academy of Science
Fellows of the Australian Academy of Technological Sciences and Engineering
Recipients of the Centenary Medal